Igor Bogdanović (born 25 September 1974) is a Serbian former professional footballer who played as a striker.

Club career
During his journeyman career, Bogdanović played for numerous clubs in his country and abroad, winning league titles in Bulgaria (Litex Lovech) and Hungary (Debrecen). He ended his career playing in the lower leagues of Hungary.

International career
At international level, Bogdanović was capped twice for FR Yugoslavia, making both appearances at the 2001 Kirin Cup. He previously played at the Millennium Super Soccer Cup, scoring two goals in five games and helping the team win the tournament. However, these caps are not officially recognized by FIFA.

Career statistics

Club

International

Honours
Litex Lovech
 A Group: 1997–98
Debrecen
 Nemzeti Bajnokság I: 2004–05, 2005–06
 Magyar Kupa: 2007–08
 Szuperkupa: 2005, 2006

References

External links
 
 
 
 
 
 

Association football forwards
Budapest Honvéd FC players
Debreceni VSC players
Expatriate footballers in Bulgaria
Expatriate footballers in Hungary
Expatriate footballers in Turkey
First League of Serbia and Montenegro players
First Professional Football League (Bulgaria) players
FK Borac Čačak players
FK Kabel players
FK Vojvodina players
FK Zemun players
Gençlerbirliği S.K. footballers
Győri ETO FC players
Hajdúböszörményi TE footballers
Nemzeti Bajnokság I players
Nemzeti Bajnokság II players
Nyíregyháza Spartacus FC players
PFC Litex Lovech players
Red Star Belgrade footballers
Serbia and Montenegro expatriate footballers
Serbia and Montenegro expatriate sportspeople in Bulgaria
Serbia and Montenegro expatriate sportspeople in Hungary
Serbia and Montenegro expatriate sportspeople in Turkey
Serbia and Montenegro footballers
Serbia and Montenegro international footballers
Serbian expatriate footballers
Serbian expatriate sportspeople in Hungary
Serbian footballers
Footballers from Novi Sad
Süper Lig players
Szombathelyi Haladás footballers
1974 births
Living people